The 2017 Judo Grand Prix Cancún was held at the Polifórum Benito Juárez in Cancún, Mexico, from 16 to 18 June 2017.

Medal summary

Men's events

Women's events

Source Results

Medal table

References

External links
 

2017 IJF World Tour
2017 Judo Grand Prix
Judo
Judo competitions in Mexico
Judo
Judo